The sixth season of Matlock originally aired in the United States on NBC with a two-hour season premiere from October 18, 1991 and a two-hour season finale on May 8, 1992.

Cast

Main 
 Andy Griffith as Ben Matlock
 Nancy Stafford as Michelle Thomas
 Julie Sommars as ADA Julie March
 Clarence Gilyard Jr. as Conrad McMasters

Recurring  
 Brynn Thayer as Leanne McIntyre

Cast notes
 Nancy Stafford and Julie Sommars departed at the end of the season
 Julie Sommars was absent for 13 episodes
 Nancy Stafford was absent for 11 episodes
 Clarence Gilyard Jr. was absent for 4 episodes

Episodes

References

External links 
 

1991 American television seasons
1992 American television seasons
06